Baruq County is in West Azerbaijan province, Iran. The capital of the county is the city of Baruq. At the 2006 census, the region's population (as Baruq District of Miandoab County) was 23,662 in 5,234 households. The following census in 2011 counted 23,014 people in 6,321 households. At the 2016 census, the district's population was 22,385 in 6,723 households. The district was elevated to the status of Baruq County in 2020 and divided into two districts.

Administrative divisions

The population history of Baruq County's administrative divisions (as a district of Miandoab County) over three consecutive censuses is shown in the following table.

References

Counties of West Azerbaijan Province

fa:شهرستان باروق